Ceracanthia eugenieae is a species of snout moth. It was described by Herbert H. Neunzig and Maria Alma Solis in 2002 and is known from Costa Rica.

References

Moths described in 2002
Phycitinae